HNLMS Van Nes is a ship of the  of multi-purpose frigates of the Royal Netherlands Navy where it used the radio call sign was "PAMI". Built by the shipyard Koninklijke Schelde Groep in Vlissingen. The ship is named after the Dutch Admiral Aert Jansse van Nes. She was sold to the Portuguese Navy where the ship was renamed Bartolomeu Dias.

Dutch service
HNLMS Van Nes is one of eight s and built at the Koninklijke Schelde Groep yard in Vlissingen. The keel laying took place on 10 January 1990 and the launching on 16 May 1992. The ship was put into service on 2 June 1994.

The ship served in the NATO squadron STANAVFORLANT from 9 October to 31 December 1999 and again in 2001.

Van Nes also took part in Operation Enduring Freedom around the Arabian Peninsula.

On 20 December 2007 the vessel was decommissioned and sold to the Portuguese Navy.

Portuguese service

In May 2018, the Bartolomeu Dias arrived at Den Helder to undergo a mid-life upgrade, which is expected to be completed in late 2019.

References

External links 
 Nederlandse-marine.nl
 mindef.nl
 scheepvaartmuseum.nl :: Maritieme kalender 1998 
 scheepvaartmuseum.nl :: Maritieme kalender 2001 

Karel Doorman-class frigates
1992 ships